Georgy is a Slavic masculine given name, derived from the Greek name Georgios. It corresponds to the English name George. The name Georgi is the most used masculine name in Bulgaria and the most given to new-born boys in the country, with the family name Georgiev/Georgieva also widely used. In Romanian the name is written as Gheorghe to signify the hard g sound. Russian derivations from Georgios include Yury.

Notable people with the surname include:
 Georgi Delchev (1872 – 1903), Bulgarian revolutionary
 Georgi Rakovski (1821 - 1867), Bulgarian revolutionary
 Georgi Ivanov (born 1940), Bulgarian cosmonaut
 Georgi Ivanov (born 1976), Bulgarian footballer
 Georgi Vazov (1860 - 1934), Bulgarian general and Minister of War
 Georgi Parvanov (born 1957), President of Bulgaria from 2002 to 2012
 Georgi Dimitrov (1882 – 1949), Bulgarian communist politician
 Georgi Asparuhov (1943 – 1971), Bulgarian footballer
 Georgy Adamovich (1892–1972), Russian poet
 Georgy Aleksandrov (1908–1961), Soviet politician
 Georgy Arbatov (1923–2010), Soviet and Russian political scientist 
 Georgy Babakin (1914–1971), Soviet aerospace engineer 
 Georgy Beregovoy (1921–1995), Soviet cosmonaut 
 Georgiy Daneliya (born 1930), Soviet and Russian film director 
 Georgy Chicherin (1872–1936), Soviet politician
 Georgy Egorychev (born 1938), Soviet and Russian mathematician
 Georgy Flyorov (1913–1990), Soviet nuclear physicist
 Georgy Ketoyev (born 1985), Russian wrestler
 Georgij Karlovich Kreyer (1887-1942), Russian botanist and mycologist
 Georgy Lvov (1861–1925), Russian politician and prime minister
 Georgy Malenkov (1902–1988), Russian politician 
 Georgi Markov (1929–1978), Bulgarian dissident
 Georgy Millyar (1903–1993), Soviet actor
 Georgy Miterev (1900–1977), Soviet minister of health
 Georgy Mondzolevski (born 1934), Soviet volleyball player
 Georgi Orlov (1884–1941), Russian-Estonian politician
 Georgi Petrov (badminton) (born 1980), Bulgarian badminton player
 Georgy Satarov (born 1947), Russian political scientist 
 Georgy Sedov (1877–1914), Russian explorer
 Georgi Shangin (born 1989), Russian ice hockey player
 Georgy Tovstonogov (1915–1989), Soviet theatre director
 Georgy Vitsin (1918–2001), Soviet and Russian actor
 Georgy Zhukov (1896–1974), Russian general

See also 
 Gheorghe
 Giorgi (name)
 Giorgio (name)